The Lagos State Executive Council (informally, the Cabinet of Lagos State) is the highest formal governmental body that plays important roles in the Government of Lagos State headed by the Governor of Lagos State. It consists of the Deputy Governor, Secretary to the State Government, Chief of Staff, Commissioners who preside over ministerial departments, and the Governor's special aides.

Functions
The Executive Council exists to advise and direct the Governor. Their appointment as members of the Executive Council gives them the authority to execute power over their fields.

Current cabinet
The current Executive Council is serving under the Babajide Sanwo-Olu administration who took office as the 15th Governor of Lagos State on 29 May 2019. In the months after the inauguration, Sanwo-Olu nominated various members of the Executive Council, mostly in batches on July 15 and August 13. On January 18, 2020, a small reshuffle was conducted which moved three Commissioners to new roles, moved two Special Advisers to become Commissioners, and appointed three new Commissioners.

See also
Lagos State Government

References

External links

Lagos
Lagos State